Trevor Anthony Vincent,  (born 27 April 1938) is a former Australian long-distance runner, specialising in the 3000 metres steeplechase. In 1962 he competed for his native country at the Commonwealth Games in Perth, Western Australia, winning the gold medal in the 3000m steeplechase event, setting an inaugural Commonwealth Games record and breaking his own Australian record. He also competed at the 1964 Summer Olympics in Tokyo, Japan in the 3000 metres steeplechase event.

Early life and family 
Trevor Vincent was born 27 April 1938 in Armadale, Victoria.

Trevor has a wife Lois and three sons: Greg, Gary and Brett. He also has eight grandchildren: Rachel, Nicohlas, Marcus, Sarah, Kate, Zhali, Rhiannon and Ebony.

Athletic career 
In 1962 Vincent competed for his native country at the 1962 British Empire and Commonwealth Games in Perth, Western Australia, winning the gold medal in the 3000m steeplechase event with a time of 8:43.4 seconds, setting an inaugural Commonwealth Games record and breaking his own Australian record of 8:49.2. The race was staged at Perry Lakes Stadium in Floreat, Western Australia on 24 November. Vincent won by 15 yards ahead of the favoured Englishmen Maurice Herriott and fellow countryman Ron Blackney who won the bronze medal. In the lead up to the Perth games, Vincent trained alongside Olympian Ron Clarke and Commonwealth Games bronze medallist Rod Bonella at Caulfield Racecourse, running up to 160 km a week.

He also competed at the 1964 Summer Olympics in Tokyo, Japan in the 3000m steeplechase event. Vincent set a time of 8:58.8 seconds, placing 8th, however failing to qualify for the final after being hampered down with injury.

Trevor attempted numerous Australian National Athletic Championships, having great success in the 3000 metres steeplechase event, 5000 metres and 1500 metres. He also attended the 1963 Australian Cross Country Championships, winning the gold medal in the 10 km event.

Personal bests

Competition record

International competitions

National championships

Personal life 
Vincent was part of the Olympic Torch Relay for the Sydney 2000 Summer Olympics. He was also a part of the Queen's Baton Relay for the Melbourne 2006 Commonwealth Games, as well as the Gold Coast 2018 Commonwealth Games.

Vincent has been awarded an Australian Sports Medal in 2000, and the Medal of the Order of Australia for service to athletics in 2008.

Trevor now coaches a weekly running group at Monash University Clayton campus for more than 100 students and staff.

See also
Olympic medalists in athletics
Athletics at the 1962 British Empire and Commonwealth Games – Men's 3000 metres steeplechase
1962 British Empire and Commonwealth Games
1964 Summer Olympics

References

External links
 
 

1938 births
Living people
Athletes (track and field) at the 1964 Summer Olympics
Athletes (track and field) at the 1962 British Empire and Commonwealth Games
Olympic athletes of Australia
Australian male long-distance runners
Australian male steeplechase runners
Commonwealth Games gold medallists for Australia
Commonwealth Games medallists in athletics
People from Armadale, Victoria
Athletes from Melbourne
Medallists at the 1962 British Empire and Commonwealth Games